Gomphidius pseudomaculatus is a mushroom in the family Gomphidiaceae that is found in Idaho in North America.

References

External links

Boletales
Fungi described in 1971
Fungi of North America